Luis da Luz  (born 2 June 1968 in Montevideo) is a former Uruguayan footballer.

Club career
Da Luz helped Sud América win Uruguayan Segunda División in 1994, and the following season scored a goal in Sud América's 4–0 rout of Club Gimnasia y Esgrima La Plata in the first round of the Copa CONMEBOL.

International career
Da Luz made one appearance for the senior Uruguay national football team a friendly against Brazil on 25 November 1992.

References

External links
 

1968 births
Living people
Uruguayan footballers
Uruguay international footballers
Danubio F.C. players
Central Español players
Footballers from Montevideo
Sud América players
Association football defenders